The list of shipwrecks in September 1923 includes ships sunk, foundered, grounded, or otherwise lost during September 1923.

1 September

2 September

4 September

5 September

6 September

8 September

10 September

12 September

15 September

17 September

18 September

21 September

24 September

25 September

27 September

28 September

29 September

30 September

References

1923-09
Maritime incidents in September 1923
09
September 1923 events